is a Japanese politician and the current mayor of Fukuoka, the capital city of Fukuoka Prefecture in Kyushu region of Japan.

References

External links 
 Official website

1974 births
Living people
Japanese politicians
People from Fukuoka
People from Ōita (city)
People from Ōita Prefecture
Mayors of places in Japan
Dokkyo University alumni